The 2007–08 Montenegrin Cup was the second season of the Montenegrin knockout football tournament. The winner of the tournament received a berth in the first qualifying round of the 2008–09 UEFA Cup. The defending champions were Rudar, who beat Sutjeska in the final of the 2006–07 competition. The competition featured 30 teams. It started on 2 October 2007 and ended with the final on 7 May 2008.

First round
The 14 matches were played on 2 and 3 October 2007.

|}

Second round
The first legs were played on 24 October and the second legs were played on 7 November 2007, with the exception of the second leg match between Sutjeska and Mogren, which was postponed until 28 November 2007.

|}

Quarter-finals
The first legs were played on 5 December and second on 12 December 2007.

|}

Semi-finals
The first legs were played on 2 April and second on 16 April 2008.

Summary

|}

First legs

Second legs

Final

References

External links
Montenegrin Cup 2007-2008 (pages 57-62) at Football Association of Montenegro's official site
Montenegrin Cup 2007-2008 at Soccerway
Montenegrin Cup 2007-2008 at RSSSF

Montenegrin Cup seasons
Cup
Montenegrin Cup, 2007-08